The Call of Love  is a 1945 Soviet comedy film directed by Konstantin Yudin.

Plot 
At the station, charming twins, infants were lost. In the arrangement of their destiny take part and a young girl-electrician, and military sailors, and gardener, and an old professor of psychology. In cares for kids, everyone finds their happiness.

Cast
 Lyudmila Tselikovskaya as Lyuba Karaseva
 Vera Orlova as Leza Karaseva
 Mikhail Zharov as Vadim Spiridonovich Yeropkin
 Andrey Tutyshkin as Dr. Petr Petrovich Listopadov
 Irina Murzaeva as Alla Vladimirovna Broshkina
 Pavel Shpringfeld as Anatoly Listopadov
  as Seaman Serei Orlikov
 Konstantin Sorokin as seaman Gharkov
 Vladimir Gribkov as building manager
 Georgy Svetlani	as seller
 Inna Fyodorova as Pavlina Yeropkina
 Svetlana Nemolyaeva	as Svetochka
 Vera Vasilyeva as monger
 Elena Tchaikovskaia as Svetochka's friend
 Tatyana Barysheva		as director of the orphanage
 Semyon Svashenko as Officer

Release 
Konstantin Yudin's film was watched by 20 million Soviet viewers, which is the 927th result in the history of Soviet film distribution.

References

External links 
 

1945 films
Soviet comedy films
Soviet black-and-white films
Films about twin sisters
1945 comedy films
Mosfilm films
1940s Russian-language films